The 1905 Tour de France was the 3rd edition of Tour de France, one of cycling's Grand Tours. The Tour began in Paris on 9 July and Stage 7 occurred on 22 July with a flat stage from Toulouse. The race finished in Paris on 29 July.

Stage 7
22 July 1905 — Toulouse to Bordeaux,

Stage 8
24 July 1905 — Bordeaux to La Rochelle,

Stage 9
26 July 1905 — La Rochelle to Rennes,

Stage 10
28 July 1905 — Rennes to Caen,

Stage 11
29 July 1905 — Caen to Paris,

References

1905 Tour de France
Tour de France stages